Svetlana Sergeevna Terentieva (born 25 September 1983 in Yekaterinburg, Russian SSR, Soviet Union) is a Russian ice hockey forward.

International career
Terentieva was selected for the Russia national women's ice hockey team in the 2002 and 2010 Winter Olympics. In both Olympics she recorded one goal in five games. She also played in the qualifying tournament for the 2006 Olympics.

Terentieva has also appeared for Russia at nine IIHF Women's World Championships. Her first appearance came in 1999. She was a part of the bronze medal winning team at the 2001 IIHF Women's World Championship.

Career statistics

International career

References

External links
Eurohockey.com Profile
Sports-Reference Profile

1983 births
Living people
Ice hockey players at the 2002 Winter Olympics
Ice hockey players at the 2010 Winter Olympics
Olympic ice hockey players of Russia
Sportspeople from Yekaterinburg
Russian women's ice hockey forwards